Burkhard Meier (2 July 1943 – 17 January 2001) was a German music educator and composer.

Life 
From 1976 to 1979 he studied composition with Wolfgang Hohensee at the "Hanns Eisler" Music Academy.
From 1967 he taught music theory and school music in Greifswald and was appointed professor in 1989. In 1990 he became director of the Institute for Musicology and Music Education at the University of Greifswald. From 1997 he was professor for practical school piano playing,  and musical composition at the Rostock University of Music and Theatre.

Meier died in Greifswald at the age of 67.

Awards 
 1984: Hanns Eisler Prize
 2000: Landeskulturpreis Mecklenburg-Vorpommern

Works 
 Die Nachtigall, children opera (after Hans Christian Andersen, 1968, Premiere: 1969)
 Liederzyklus Lob des Sisyphus (1984)
 Kausalitäten für Bläserquintett (1987)
 Musik für Orchester (1987)

References

External links 
 
 Burkhard Meier, Munzinger Online/Komponisten der Gegenwart, in Munzinger-Archiv (Burkhard Meier Start of article freely available)
 

German music educators
20th-century German composers
20th-century classical composers
Academic staff of the University of Greifswald
1943 births
2001 deaths
People from Eberswalde